The Araz-Naxçıvan 2014–15 season was to be Araz-Naxçıvan's second Azerbaijan Premier League season, and first since the 2000–01 season. However they failed to complete the season after withdrawing from the league after 10 rounds, on 17 November 2014, with all their contracted players becoming free agents.

Squad

Transfers

Summer

In:

Out:

Competitions

Azerbaijan Premier League

Results summary

Results by round

Results

League table

Azerbaijan Cup

Squad statistics

Appearances and goals

|-
|colspan="14"|Players who appeared for Araz-Naxçıvan no longer at the club:

|}

Goal scorers

Disciplinary record

Notes
Qarabağ have played their home games at the Tofiq Bahramov Stadium since 1993 due to the ongoing situation in Quzanlı.
Following Araz-Naxçıvan's withdrawal from the Azerbaijan Premier League, Khazar Lankaran were awarded the victory.

References 

Araz-Naxcivan
Araz-Naxçıvan PFK seasons